Emily Rooney (born January 17, 1950) is an American journalist, TV talk show and radio host and former news producer. She hosted the weekly program Beat the Press on WGBH-TV. until its cancellation on August 13, 2021.

Career 
In the mid-to-late 1970s, Rooney worked at the CBS affiliate in Hartford, Connecticut, WFSB as an assignment editor among other positions at the station. From 1979 to 1993, she worked at WCVB-TV in Boston as assistant news director, and then a news director for three years. For about one year, from 1993 to 1994, she was executive producer of World News Tonight with Peter Jennings, ABC's nightly news program. Following her tenure with ABC and WCVB, Rooney was director of political coverage and special events at the Fox Network in New York, from 1994 to 1997.

From 1997 to 2014, she was also the creator, executive editor, and moderator of Greater Boston, which was later rebroadcast on the Boston-based WGBH radio station, where she also hosted the Emily Rooney Show. During that same period, Rooney moderated a weekly media analysis TV show, Beat the Press.

On May 29, 2014, WGBH announced Emily Rooney would be stepping down from her host position on the Greater Boston TV show to become a special correspondent for the program. After 18 years as host, her final Greater Boston show aired on December 18 of that year. She continued to host Beat the Press until its cancellation on August 13, 2021.

Controversy 
On March 29, 2021, a public letter signed by over 700 filmmakers was sent to PBS President Paula Kerger titled, "A letter to PBS from Viewers like Us". It was organized by Beyond Inclusion, BIPOC-led collective of non-fiction filmmakers, executives, and field builders.." The letter was in response to recent conversations sparked by Grace Lee’s essay for the Ford Foundation’s Creative Futures series and Kerger’s public response to it.

That letter raised questions about how much funding and airtime filmmaker Ken Burns has received over the years in comparison to BIPOC filmmakers, and demanded access to specific data about equity across the board.

On April 2, 2021, during a Beat the Press episode discussing the PBS letter, the six-hour documentary Hemingway by Ken Burns, and the five-hour documentary Asian Americans from Renee Tajima-Peña, Emily Rooney remarked, "I didn’t see Asian Americans but there’s a possibility it wasn’t as good as some of Ken Burns’ films." At the end of the show, she stated, "regardless of what this group says, it’s resentment that a white guy [Burns] is getting all this time.

On April 14, a letter was sent to WGBH from a New England group of filmmakers that grew out of the Documentary Producers Alliance-Northeast in solidarity with Beyond Inclusion, also condemning Rooney’s comments. In reply, WGBH General Manager Pam Johnston "rebuked the comments" in a statement: "Emily Rooney’s comments on the April 2 edition of Beat the Press did not meet WGBH’s standards for opinion journalism, or our commitment to being an anti-racist organization that respects all people."

In a follow-up letter dated April 16, the regional group now referred to as Filmmakers in Solidarity, pointed out the urgent need to address the lack of diverse voices in public media locally, as well as nationally. Among other requests, they demanded Rooney apologize for relying on "derision, racist tropes and more ignorance than fact" when discussing the lack of diverse filmmakers on PBS.

On April 16, she issued a pre-recorded apology at the start of her WGBH show, Beat the Press. In it, Rooney said her remarks were "uninformed, dismissive, and disrespectful" and while her "intention was to offer further balance to the discussion" she acknowledged "my comments did not accomplish that and instead I crossed a line."

Asian Americans, from Series Producer Renee Tajima-Peña, won a Peabody Award in June 2021.

Personal life 
Emily Rooney is the daughter of noted CBS 60 Minutes correspondent and humorist Andy Rooney. She has an identical twin sister, Martha, who is Chief of the Public Services Division at the United States National Library of Medicine in Bethesda, Maryland. Her brother Brian Rooney was a correspondent for ABC News for 23 years. Rooney has one daughter, Alexis. Rooney's husband, WCVB-TV reporter Kirby Perkins, died suddenly of heart failure July 1997.  Rooney lived in the metro west suburb of Newton for many years and now resides in Boston's Back Bay neighborhood.

Education 
She is a graduate of American University in Washington and holds honorary doctoral degrees from the University of Massachusetts Boston and Westfield State College.

Honors 
Emily Rooney has been awarded the National Press Club's Arthur Rowse Award for Press Criticism, a series of New England Emmy Awards, and Associated Press recognition for Best News/Talk Show. Rooney's WGBH news program, Greater Boston, has received two Regional Edward R. Murrow broadcast journalism awards and five New England Emmy awards. Rooney has also received a New England Emmy in the category of Outstanding Achievement in Commentary/Editorial.

References

External links
 

American talk radio hosts
American University alumni
American women radio presenters
1950 births
Living people
Identical twins
American twins
WGBH Educational Foundation